The Isle of Man has had a number of windmills over the centuries. They were mostly threshing mills, with a few corn mills.

Ballawhane, Andreas

NX 398 012 

This small mill  at Andreas was a threshing mill built c.1870. It was derelict in 1952. In 2007, it was proposed to add the mill to the Isle of Man's Protected Buildings Register.

Mullen Guiye, Andreas

A skeletal mill was painted by J Coleman in 1899. The mill had four shuttered sails and there was a drive through the centre of the mill and then into a barn. It is probably Mullen Guiye, which was a small threshing mill. The mill was still in existence in 1902.

Ballacorage, Ballaugh
SC 348 956 

This small mill at Ballaugh was a threshing mill on a farm, built in 1878.

Castletown

SC 259 677 

The five storey tower mill at Castletown was built in 1828. The mill drove four pairs of millstones and there was a threshing mill in one of the barns attached to the mill. It was tailwinded and lost its sails shortly after completion in 1828. In August 1829, the mill was tailwinded and the sails were damaged. It was destroyed by fire on 6 January 1850. It was a ruin by 1874. The mill was used as a museum of witchcraft from 1951 to the 1960s, thus gaining its local name of The Witches Mill. It was house converted in the 1990s, with a glass roof being built within the tower.

A Titt iron wind engine was erected at Castletown in May 1892, replacing a steam engine.

Ballamoar, Jurby

The mill at Jurby was mentioned in the will of Captain Thomas Christian in 1725.

Baldromma, Maughold

SC 490 913 

The small tower threshing mill at Maughold was built c.1881. It had four common sails which rotated in a clockwise direction. The mill had no cap and there was a stage at first floor level. The mill had sails on in 1909 but these had gone by 1949. The tower has been incorporated into a modern house.

Billown Quarry, Malew
SC 269 702 

This was a large iron windpump.

South Barrule, Malew

SC 270 768 

This small tower mill was built c.1902 to work an incline on a  gauge railway serving the slate quarry on South Barrule, Malew. The tower survives.

The Rhyne, Marown

The small threshing mill at Marown was built c.1860. Legend states that stones from a keeill were used in the construction of the mill, and that when set in motion the mill went so fast that it shook the premises, and had to be taken down as a consequence.

Bootleyvelt, Maughold

The mill at Bootleyvelt, Maughold, was apparently built in a tall tree. It was used for chopping gorse.

Michael
SC 318 907 

The mill at Michael may have been a saw or threshing mill. A five sailed mill reputedly burnt down in 1865 and was replaced by a four sailed mill.

Ballakermeen, Onchan

The mill at Ballakermeen, Onchan was a scutching and corn mill. Permission for it to be built was granted in 1755. It was in existence in the 1780s but had gone by 1790.

Ballaquane, Peel

A windmill was recorded at Peel in 1608, but had gone by 1648. Another windmill was built in 1841 and burnt down on 17 December 1847.

Lezayre Mill, Ramsey
SC 445 952 

The tower mill at Ramsey was a combined corn and saw mill. It was built by John Monk and completed on 29 August 1836. A steam engine was added as auxiliary power in 1862. It is thought that the windmill ceased to work by the end of the 1870s.

See also
Registered Buildings of the Isle of Man

References

Books

External links
 Photo of windmill at Ballacorage, Ballaugh

History of the Isle of Man
Windmills
Isle of Man